Saunt is a surname. Notable people with the surname include:

Claudio Saunt (born 1967), American professor, author, and historian 
Deborah Saunt (born 1965), Australian-born English architect, urban designer, and academic

See also
Anathem